Stefanovski (Macedonian Cyrillic:Стефановски) is a Macedonian surname meaning 'son of Stephen'. Stefanovic is the Serbian variant.

Notable Stefanovskis:

Goran Stefanovski (b. 1952) Macedonian dramatist.
Vlatko Stefanovski (b. 1957) Macedonian guitarist.

See also
Stefan (disambiguation)

Surnames
Macedonian-language surnames